Anniston is a city in Mississippi County, Missouri, United States. The population was 180 at the 2020 census.

History
Anniston was originally called "Hainley's Switch", after Jacob Hainley, the proprietor of a local mill. A post office called Hainley's Switch was established in 1890, and the name was changed to Anniston in 1894. The present name is a transfer from Anniston, Alabama.

Geography
Anniston is located along Missouri Route 75, east of the highway's intersection with Missouri Route 105.  Charleston lies to the north, and East Prairie lies to the southwest.

Demographics

2010 census
As of the census of 2010, there were 232 people, 94 households, and 61 families living in the city. The racial makeup of the city was 97.41% White, 2.16% Black or African American, and 0.43% from two or more races.

There were 94 households, of which 30.9% had children under the age of 18 living with them, 46.8% were married couples living together, 12.8% had a female householder with no husband present, 5.3% had a male householder with no wife present, and 35.1% were non-families. 29.8% of all households were made up of individuals, and 16% had someone living alone who was 65 years of age or older. The average household size was 2.47 and the average family size was 3.10.

The median age in the city was 43.4 years. 22.4% of residents were under the age of 18; 6% were between the ages of 18 and 24; 23.7% were from 25 to 44; 25% were from 45 to 64; and 22.8% were 65 years of age or older. The gender makeup of the city was 49.1% male and 50.9% female.

2000 census
As of the census of 2000, there were 285 people, 118 households, and 78 families living in the town. The population density was 717.9 people per square mile (275.1/km). There were 133 housing units at an average density of 335.0 per square mile (128.4/km). The racial makeup of the town was 97.54% White and 2.46% African American. Hispanic or Latino of any race were 0.35% of the population.

There were 118 households, out of which 25.4% had children under the age of 18 living with them, 55.9% were married couples living together, 7.6% had a female householder with no husband present, and 33.1% were non-families. 28.8% of all households were made up of individuals, and 13.6% had someone living alone who was 65 years of age or older. The average household size was 2.42 and the average family size was 2.96.

In the town the population was spread out, with 22.8% under the age of 18, 8.4% from 18 to 24, 27.4% from 25 to 44, 24.6% from 45 to 64, and 16.8% who were 65 years of age or older. The median age was 38 years. For every 100 females there were 103.6 males. For every 100 females age 18 and over, there were 103.7 males.

The median income for a household in the town was $22,232, and the median income for a family was $26,000. Males had a median income of $20,625 versus $17,031 for females. The per capita income for the town was $9,626. About 11.1% of families and 15.4% of the population were below the poverty line, including 22.1% of those under the age of eighteen and 12.0% of those 65 or over.

Education
In 1963, voters of the Charleston, Anniston, and Fox school districts passed a unified school district reorganization plan by a vote of 1,111 to 167.

References

External links

Cities in Mississippi County, Missouri
Cities in Missouri